The following is an article listing television series that are currently being broadcast or have previously aired on This TV, a digital broadcast network owned by film and television studio Metro-Goldwyn-Mayer and Chicago-based broadcast television group Tribune Broadcasting.

Although the large proportion of This TV's programming consists of movies from MGM and its film studio subsidiaries, approximately five hours of the network's weekday schedule, ten and a half hours of its Saturday schedule, and nine and a half hours of its Sunday schedule feature syndicated television series that MGM has ownership rights, the KidsClick children's programming block, and E/I compliant children's programming.

Current programming

Drama series
The Avengers (2018–present)
The Saint (2018–present)
In the Heat of the Night (2013–present)
Sea Hunt (2009-2012; 2013–present)

Westerns
Bat Masterson (2009–2012; 2016–present)
Mackenzie's Raiders (2016–present)

Children's programming
E/I Indicates program features content in line with FCC E/I programming guidelines.
Awesome Adventures E/I (2016–present)
Get Wild at the San Diego Zoo E/I (2016–present)
Whaddyado E/I (2016–present)
Wild About Animals E/I (2016–present)
Wild World at the San Diego Zoo E/I (2016–present)

Former programming

Children’s programming 

On the Spot E/I (2013–2016)
Zoo Clues E/I (2013–2016)

References

This TV